Chup Chup Ke is a 2006 Indian Hindi-language comedy drama film directed  by Priyadarshan. Originally titled Khatta Meetha, it is adapted from Malayalam film Punjabi House (1998). The film stars Shahid Kapoor, Kareena Kapoor, Neha Dhupia, Suniel Shetty, Paresh Rawal, Rajpal Yadav, Shakti Kapoor, Om Puri and Anupam Kher.

Plot
Jeetu, the son of a retired teacher named Jaidev Prasad, is debt-ridden due to many failed businesses. Jeetu breaks off his engagement with his promised fiancé, Pooja and decides to commit suicide by throwing himself into the sea for insurance money that his father would pay off his debts. However, Jeetu is found tangled in the fishing nets by a pair of fishermen, Gundya and Bandya who rescue him and mistake him to be mute and deaf.

Gundya owes money to a Gujarati businessman, Prabhat Singh Chauhan, who takes away Gundya's boat. Gundya cunningly makes Prabhat believe that Jeetu is his loving nephew and leaves both Jeetu and Bandya in Prabhat's house as the guarantee until he returns the money. Prabhat's niece Shruti is mute too, but not deaf. Her overprotective brother Mangal wants her to get married, however, her muteness makes her an undesirable match. One night, Shruti and her cousin Meenakshi learn Jeetu's secret and makes him break off Shruti's undesirable marriage match to keep his secret.

Shruti and Meenakshi send money to Jeetu's village through Bandya to repay his debts. Bandya returns from the village and tells Jeetu that Pooja is married now. Unaware that Pooja believes herself to be Jeetu's widow, is living with Jeetu's family. At the same time, Shruti confesses her love for Jeetu. Mangal approves their marriage after Jeetu reveals he is not deaf and mute. Later, Mangal sends Gundya and Bandya to deliver a suitcase of money to Jeetu's family to secure their financial well-being. However, while delivering the money they inadvertently reveal that Jeetu is alive. Shocked, Jaidev demands that they take him to Jeetu. Jaidev arrives at Prabhat's house during Jeetu and Shruti's engagement ceremony and sees him alive.

Jaidev reveals to Jeetu that Pooja is living as his widow and implores him to return home and marry Pooja. Jeetu later goes back home to speak to his family but they demand he marry Pooja, and Gundya and Bandya bring him back. On the day of the wedding, Jeetu's family intrude on the marriage, wanting for him to return and marry Pooja instead. However, when Pooja learns that Shruti is mute, she has a change of heart and tells Jeetu to marry Shruti. Jeetu and Shruti get married and live happily ever after.

Cast
Suniel Shetty as Mangal Singh Chauhan 
Kareena Kapoor as Shruti Singh Chauhan
Shahid Kapoor as Jeet Prasad Sharma, a.k.a. Jeetu / Kanhaiya a.k.a. Jabba
Dileep dubbed for the dumb parts
Neha Dhupia as Meenakshi Singh Chauhan 
Paresh Rawal as fisherman Gundya Lal
Rajpal Yadav as fisherman Bandya Lal
Shakti Kapoor as Natwar Jhunjhunwala
Om Puri as Prabhat Singh Chauhan
Anupam Kher as Jaidev Prasad Sharma, Jeetu's father.
Manoj Joshi as Mohan Prakash Rao
Asrani as Sharmaji, Househelper.
Sushama Reddy as Pooja Rao, Jeetu's fiancé.
Amita Nangia as Mrs. Sharma, Jeetu's mother.
Amitha Rajan as Rupa Sharma, Jeetu's sister.

Release and reception
The film was released on 9 June 2006 in India. Chup Chup Ke received generally mixed reviews. Rediff.com critic Sukanya Verma praised the cinematography and Paresh Rawal and Rajpal Yadav's comedic performances. She also commented that the romance between Shahid Kapoor and Kareena Kapoor lacked chemistry. The Times of India reviewer also thought that the romance between Shahid and Kareena was not believable and also criticised the lack of humour. The film grossed ₹25.5 crore at the box office worldwide. Chup Chup Ke's television premiere occurred on Star Gold.

Soundtrack

References

External links 
 
 

2006 films
2000s Hindi-language films
Films directed by Priyadarshan
Films scored by Himesh Reshammiya
Hindi remakes of Malayalam films
UTV Motion Pictures films